HR Sendesaal, formerly Großer Sendesaal des Hessischen Rundfunks (English: Large broadcasting hall of the Hessischer Rundfunk) is a music hall and former television studio based in Frankfurt am Main, Germany. The hall is part of the Broadcasting House Dornbusch, the former headquarters of the German public broadcaster Hessischer Rundfunk (HR).

History

Construction of the music hall began when the foundation stone was laid on 28 February 1953, and was ready for use on 30 September 1954. The building was designed by the architect Gerhard Weber. The hall has 840 seats and was built to house the broadcaster's own radio orchestra, Frankfurt Radio Symphony and was the workplace of the orchestra until 1987–1988, when the hall was completely rebuilt and changed its name to HR Sendesaal.

The version of Mixtur for reduced orchestra was premiered here, as part of the Darmstädter Ferienkurse on 23 August 1967 by the Ensemble Hudba Dneska conducted by Ladislav Kupkovič, to whom this version is dedicated.

Although the hall was mainly built for radio, television broadcasts were also produced from there in the early years. In 1957, it played host to the Eurovision Song Contest. The hall was also used for lectures and debates. In 1968, a debate was held on the German  (Emergency Acts), which were introduced the same year.

The concert hall was built with technically modern equipment and is tailored for radio and sound productions rather than TV productions. Walls and ceilings are equipped with 60,000 sound-absorbing round wooden boards, these were installed to provide the best possible acoustics for radio. Today, the hall is used for concerts and radio recordings in all genres.

See also
Broadcasting House Dornbusch

References

External links

"Großer Sendesaal im Hessischen Rundfunk", Film Commission Hessen (in German)
Pictures from the 1957 Eurovision Song Contest

Hessischer Rundfunk
Radio in Germany
Television in Germany
Buildings and structures in Frankfurt
Concert halls in Germany
Music in Frankfurt
Mass media in Frankfurt
Buildings and structures completed in 1954
Music venues completed in 1954
Tourist attractions in Frankfurt